The Commercial Press is the first modern publishing organisation in China.

History

In 1897, 26-year-old Xia Ruifang and three of his friends (including the Bao brothers Bao Xian'en and Bao Xianchang) founded The Commercial Press in Shanghai. All four were Protestant Christians who received their training at the American Presbyterian Mission Press. The group soon received financial backing and began publishing books such as Bibles. In 1914, Xia attempted to buy out a Japanese company that had invested in The Commercial Press.  Four days later he was assassinated.  There was much speculation as to who was behind the assassination; no one was ever arrested for the crime.

From 1903 Zhang Yuanji (张元济) (1867-1959), reacting to China's moves towards a new curriculum, created a number of textbook and translation series, and from 1904 and in subsequent years he launched popular periodicals, such as Dongfang dazhi (Eastern Miscellany)(1904), Jiaoyu zazhi (The Chinese Education Journal), Xiaoshuo Zazhi (Short Story Magazine), Xuesheng Zazhi (Student Magazine) and Funu Zazhi (Women's Journal).

In 1932 The Commercial Press was bombed by the Imperial Japanese Army during the January 28 Incident. The bombing destroyed its headquarters in Zhabei, Shanghai, and its attached Oriental Library (Dongfang Tushuguan) and its collection of more than 500,000 books, including tens of thousands of rare books.

At the turn of the century The Commercial Press became a major publisher of textbooks.  Today it is headquartered in Beijing and continues as an active publishing house of Chinese language learning materials including dictionaries, textbooks, pedagogical texts, and a cultural magazine called The World of Chinese.

Evolution
In 1902 it was set up with a forward attitude toward both Chinese and Western studies.

In 1903 it became China's first primary education textbook publisher.  It later produced 2,550 secondary school textbooks that became popular in the country.

In 1904 it launched the "Eastern Miscellany" (東方雜誌) with editor-in-chief (杜亞泉).

In 1907 the press moved to an  new plant.

In 1909 it launched the "Education Magazine" (教育雜誌).

In 1910 it launched "The Short Story Magazine" (小說月報).

In 1911 it launched the "Youth Magazine" (少年雜誌).

In January 1914, the founder of The Commercial Press, Xia Ruifang, was stabbed to death.

In 1914 it set up a branch in "Hong Kong Museum" of the same year.   It also launched the "Students' Magazine" (學生雜誌).

In 1915 it printed the first dictionary.

In 1916 it set up a branch in Singapore.

In 1921 with Hu Shih's recommendation, Wang Yunwu (王雲五) became the general manager modernising it into a business. The first edition of Zhongguo renming dacidian was published.

In 1924, "The Commercial Press Oriental Library" (東方圖書館), one of the largest private libraries in China at the time, opened in Shanghai.

In 1929, it published the first set of the 4,000-volume encyclopaedic literary collection Wanyou Wenku.

On 28 January 1932, the January 28 Incident began.  On 1 February Japanese aircraft bombed the Commercial Press in conjunction with the Oriental Library. Imperial Japanese army would occupy Shanghai the next day. TCP resumed operation on 1 August 1932.

In 1949, TCP's operation was relocated away from China after Liberation Army had entered Shanghai.

In 1954, the TCP's headquarter was moved from Shanghai to Beijing shifting the focus to academic works published in the West.

In 1993, the separate Commercial Press companies in Mainland China, Hong Kong, Taiwan, Singapore, and Malaysia established a joint venture to become "The Commercial Press International Limited."

In 2011, the Beijing office was changed into limited liability company (商务印书馆有限公司).

When China publishing and Media Holdings Co.,Ltd. (中国出版传媒股份有限公司) was founded in 2011-12-19, the newly founded company became the parent company.

Subsidiaries
? (汉语编辑中心): Subsidiary of the Beijing branch.
? (学术编辑中心): Subsidiary of the Beijing branch.
? (英语编辑室): Subsidiary of the Beijing branch.
? (外语编辑室): Subsidiary of the Beijing branch.
? (教科文编辑中心): Subsidiary of the Beijing branch.
? (数字出版中心): Subsidiary of the Beijing branch.
? (百年资源部): Subsidiary of the Beijing branch.
The Commercial Press International Co., Ltd. (商务印书馆国际有限公司): Founded in 1993 by The Commercial Press branches in Beijing, Hong Kong, Taipei, Singapore, Kuala Lumpur.
The World of English Inc. (《英语世界》杂志社有限公司): Founded in 1981.
The World of Chinese Magazine (《汉语世界》杂志社有限责任公司):
The Commercial Press (Nanning) Ltd. (商务印书馆（南宁）有限责任公司)
? (商务印书馆（成都）有限责任公司): Founded in Apr 2011.
? (商务印书馆（上海）有限公司): Founded in 2011.
? (商务印书馆（杭州）有限公司): Founded in Jun 2012.
? (商务印书馆（深圳）有限公司): Founded in Sep 2012.
The Commercial Press Taiyuan Ltd. (商务印书馆（太原）有限公司/商務印書館太原分馆): Founded in Jan 2013.
? (商印文津文化（北京）有限责任公司): Founded in Nov 2011.
? (北京涵芬楼文化传播有限公司): Founded in 2009-11-11.

Former subsidiaries
Dongfang Tushuguan/Oriental Library (東方圖書館): A library founded in 1925, and was later destroyed in 1932.

The Commercial Press (Hong Kong) Limited (商務印書館（香港）有限公司): Founded in 1914 (香港商務印書館/商務印書館香港分館) in Hong Kong as a subsidiary of the Beijing TCP. In 1988-06-10, it was incorporated as The Commercial Press (Hong Kong) Limited (商務印書館（香港）有限公司). When Sino United Publishing (Holdings) Limited was established, it became a subsidiary of SUP.
Commercial Press (HK) Cyberbooks Ltd. (商務印書館（香港）網上書店有限公司): Online bookstore for The Commercial Press (H.K.) Ltd. Founded in 1999-03-18 as CP BooksNet. The site CP1897.com was founded in 2000-04-12 with SUNeVision.
? (商務印書館香港印刷廠): Established in 1924 in Sai Wan, Hong Kong as a printer for TCP's Hong Kong branch. In 1933, it was moved to North Point. In 1980, it was merged with ? (中華書局香港印刷廠) and ? (大千印刷公司) into C & C Joint Printing Co., (H.K.) Ltd. (中華商務聯合印刷（香港）有限公司).
Hong Kong Educational Publishing Company (香港教育圖書公司): Established in 1979 as a textbook and reference publisher.
Bloomsbury Books Limited/Bloomsbury Books Ltd.: In November 2005, The Commercial Press (H.K.) Ltd. acquired Bloomsbury Books as an extension of its professional arm serving the legal and business communities in Hong Kong.
EdFun Limited (同學坊): Established in 2005.
The Commercial Press, Ltd. (臺灣商務印書館股份有限公司): In Sep 1947, TCP's Fuzhou branch manager Ye Youmei entered Taiwan to plan for the branch. In Oct 1947, TCP bought a wooden and brick house in 37 Chongqing South Road 1st Section for the planned Taiwan headquarter. In 1948, the Taiwan branch (商務印書館臺灣分館) began operation. In 1949, the Taiwan branch became an independent entity under the demand from Taiwanese government, and the Chinese name was changed (臺灣商務印書館). In 1950-10-10, the company completed registration.
The Commercial Press (S) Pte. Limited (商務印書館（新）有限公司/商務印書館（新加坡）有限公司): Established in 1916 as the Beijing TCP's Singapore branch. As of 2016, it is a subsidiary of Sino United Publishing (Holdings) Limited.
K. L. Commercial Book Company (M) Sdn. Bhd. (商務印書館（馬）有限公司/商務印書館（馬來西亞）有限公司): Established in 1956 as the Beijing TCP's Malaysia branch. In 1987, K. L. Commercial Book Company (M) Sdn. Bhd. was registered as a limited liability company operating independently. As of 2016, it is a subsidiary of Sino United Publishing (Holdings) Limited.

See also
 Publishing industry in China

References

Publications

External links

The Commercial Press (Beijing)
The Commercial Press International Co., Ltd.
The Commercial Press (Hong Kong) Limited
The Commercial Press, Ltd.
Commercial Press (HK) Cyberbooks Ltd.
EdFun Limited
Hong Kong Educational Publishing Company

 
Book publishing companies of China
Publishing companies established in 1897
Bookshops of Hong Kong
Companies based in Beijing
Mass media in Shanghai
Mass media in Beijing